Stephen John Leaney (born 10 March 1969) is a professional golfer from Australia.

Born in Busselton, Western Australia, Leaney turned professional in 1992 and won several tournaments in Australia in the 1990s, despite having two ribs cut removed in December 1993 after doctors diagnosed a blood clot in his shoulder. Leaney has since spoken to W.A media and confirmed the threatening injury may have been caused from his prior to golf career in premier league darts. Between 1998 and 2003 he made the top 15 on the European Tour Order of Merit three times and won four European Tour events. Since 2004 he has played mainly on the based PGA Tour, but he has performed only moderately. His best finish in the United States remains a second place at the U.S. Open in 2003. He has featured in the top 50 of the Official World Golf Rankings.

Leaney has represented his country several times as an amateur and a professional and was a member of the International Team at the 2003 Presidents Cup.

Amateur wins
1992 (2) Malaysian Amateur Championship, Lake Macquarie Amateur

Professional wins (16)

European Tour wins (4)

European Tour playoff record (0–1)

PGA Tour of Australasia wins (4)

PGA Tour of Australasia playoff record (1–0)

Other wins (8)
1991 Western Australian Open (as an amateur) (Foundation Tour)
1994 Western Australian Open (Foundation Tour)
1997 Western Australian Open, Western Australia PGA Championship (both Foundation Tour)
2001 Nedlands Masters
2002 Western Australian Open (incorporating the Nedlands Masters)
2004 Western Australian Open (incorporating the Nedlands Masters)
2010 Nedlands Masters

Results in major championships

CUT = missed the half-way cut
"T" = tied

Summary

Most consecutive cuts made – 3 (2002 Open Championship – 2003 Open Championship)
Longest streak of top-10s – 1

Results in The Players Championship

CUT = missed the halfway cut

Results in World Golf Championships

1Cancelled due to 9/11

QF, R16, R32, R64 = Round in which player lost in match play
"T" = Tied
NT = No tournament

Results in senior major championships

"T" indicates a tie for a place
NT = No tournament due to COVID-19 pandemic

Team appearances
Amateur
Nomura Cup (representing Australia): 1991 (winners)
Eisenhower Trophy (representing Australia): 1992
Sloan Morpeth Trophy (representing Australia): 1991 (winners), 1992

Professional
Alfred Dunhill Cup (representing Australia): 1999, 2000
Presidents Cup (International Team): 2003 (tie)
World Cup (representing Australia): 2003, 2004

References

External links

Australian male golfers
PGA Tour of Australasia golfers
European Tour golfers
PGA Tour golfers
People from Busselton
1969 births
Living people